Guðmundur Helgason (born 29 June 1961) is an Icelandic weightlifter. He competed in the men's middle heavyweight event at the 1980 Summer Olympics.

References

1961 births
Living people
Icelandic male weightlifters
Olympic weightlifters of Iceland
Weightlifters at the 1980 Summer Olympics
Place of birth missing (living people)